Alejandra Ambrosi is a Mexican television actress. Born in Mexico City, Mexico. Known for participating in several Mexican telenovelas, series and films. She is best known for her remarkable characters in telenovelas such as Dulce amargo, Las trampas del deseo, and Las Malcriadas.

Filmography

Film roles

Television roles

Awards and nominations

References

External links 
 

Living people
Mexican telenovela actresses
Mexican film actresses
21st-century Mexican actresses
Actresses from Mexico City
Year of birth missing (living people)
Mexican people of Italian descent